Amblyteles is a genus of parasitic wasps in the family Ichneumonidae.

Distribution 
Amblyteles is present in the Palearctic realm and Asia.

Species 
Amblyteles armatorius (Förster, 1771) 
Amblyteles pealei Cockerell, 1927 † (extinct)
Amblyteles sonani Uchida, 1932

References

Ichneumonidae genera